Lawsonite is a hydrous calcium aluminium sorosilicate mineral with formula CaAl2Si2O7(OH)2·H2O. Lawsonite crystallizes in the orthorhombic system in prismatic, often tabular crystals. Crystal twinning is common. It forms transparent to translucent colorless, white, and bluish to pinkish grey glassy to greasy crystals. Refractive indices are nα=1.665, nβ=1.672 - 1.676, and nγ=1.684 - 1.686. It is typically almost colorless in thin section, but some lawsonite is pleochroic from colorless to pale yellow to pale blue, depending on orientation. The mineral has a Mohs hardness of 8 and a specific gravity of 3.09. It has perfect cleavage in two directions and a brittle fracture.

Lawsonite is a metamorphic mineral typical of the blueschist facies. It also occurs as a secondary mineral in altered gabbro and diorite. Associate minerals include epidote, titanite, glaucophane, garnet and quartz. It is an uncommon constituent of eclogite.

Lawsonite was first described in 1895 for occurrences on Ring_Mountain_(California) of the Tiburon peninsula, Marin County, California and was named after geologist Andrew Lawson (1861–1952) of the University of California by two of Lawson's graduate students, Charles Palache and Frederick Leslie Ransome.

Composition
Lawsonite is a metamorphic silicate mineral related chemically and structurally to the epidote group of minerals.  It is close to the ideal composition of CaAl2Si2O7(OH)2 . H2O giving it a close chemical composition with anorthite CaAl2Si2O8 (its anhydrous equivalent), yet lawsonite has greater density and a different Al coordination (Comodi et al., 1996).  The substantial amount of water bound in lawsonite’s crystal structure is released during its breakdown to denser minerals during prograde metamorphism.  This means lawsonite is capable of conveying appreciable water to shallow depths in subducting oceanic lithosphere (Clarke et al., 2006).  Experimentation on lawsonite to vary its responses at different temperatures and different pressures is among its most studied aspects, for it is these qualities that affect its abilities to carry water down to mantle depths, similar to other OH-containing phases like antigorite, talc, phengite, staurolite, and epidote (Comodi et al., 1996).

Geologic occurrence
Lawsonite is a very widespread mineral and has attracted considerable interest because of its importance as a marker of moderate pressure (6-12 kb) and low temperature (300 - 400 °C) conditions in nature (Clarke et al., 2006).  This mainly occurs along continental margins (subduction zones) such as those found in: the Franciscan Formation in California at Reed Station, Tiburon Peninsula of Marin County, California; the Piedmont metamorphic rocks of Italy; and schists in New Zealand, New Caledonia, China, Japan and from various points in the circum-Pacific orogenic belt.

Crystal structure
Though lawsonite and anorthite have similar compositions, their structures are quite different.  While anorthite has a tetrahedral coordination with Al (Al substitutes for Si in feldspars), lawsonite has an octahedral coordination with Al, making it an orthorhombic sorosilicate with a space group of Cmcm which consists of Si2O7 Groups and O, OH, F, and H2O with cations in [4] and/or > [4] coordination.  This is much similar to the epidote group which lawsonite is often found in conjunction with, which are also sorosilicates because their structure consists of two connected SiO4 tetrahedra plus connecting cation.  The water contained in its structure is made possible by cavities formed by rings of two Al octahedral and two Si2O7 groups, each containing an isolated water molecule and calcium atom.  The hydroxyl units are bound to the edge-sharing Al octahedral (Baur, 1978).

Physical properties
Lawsonite has crystal habits of orthorhombic prismatic, which are crystals shaped like slender prisms, or tubular figures, which are form dimensions that are thin in one direction, both with two perfect cleavages.  This crystal is transparent to translucent and varies in color from white to pale blue to colorless with a white streak and a vitreous or greasy luster.  It has a relatively low specific gravity of 3.1g/cm3, and a pretty high hardness of 7.5 on Mohs scale of hardness, slightly higher than quartz.  Under the microscope, lawsonite can be seen as blue, yellow, or colorless under plane polarized light while the stage is rotated.  Lawsonite has three refractive indices of nα = 1.665 nβ = 1.672 - 1.676 nγ = 1.684 - 1.686, which produces a birefringence of δ = 0.019 - 0.021 and an optically positive biaxial interference figure.

Significance of lawsonite

Lawsonite is a significant metamorphic mineral as it can be used as an index mineral for high pressure conditions.  Index minerals are used in geology to determine the degree of metamorphism a rock has experienced.  New metamorphic minerals form through solid-state cation exchanges following changing pressure and temperature conditions imposed upon the protolith (pre-metamorphosed rock).  This new mineral that is produced in the metamorphosed rock is the index mineral, which indicates the minimum pressure and temperature the protolith must have achieved in order for that mineral to form.

Lawsonite is known to form in high pressure, low temperature conditions, most commonly found in subduction zones where cold oceanic crust subducts down oceanic trenches into the mantle (Comodi et al., 1996). The initially low temperature of the slab, and fluids taken down with it manage to depress isotherms and keep the slab much colder than the surrounding mantle, allowing for these unusual high pressure, low temperature conditions. Glaucophane, kyanite and zoisite are other common minerals in the blueschist facies and are commonly found to coexist (Pawley et al., 1996). This assemblage is diagnostic of this facies.

References

 Hurlbut, Cornelius S.; Klein, Cornelis, 1985, Manual of Mineralogy, 20th ed., Wiley, 
 Comodi P. and Zanazzi P. F. (1996) Effects of temperature and pressure on the structure of lawsonite, Piazza University, Perugia, Italy. American Mineralogist 81, 833-841.
Baur W. H. (1978) Crystal structure refinement of lawsonite, University of Illinois, Chicago, Illinois. American Mineralogist 63, 311-315.
Clarke G. L., Powell R., Fitzherbert J. A. (2006) The lawsonite paradox: a comparison of field evidence and mineral equilibria modeling, Australia. J. metamorphis Geol. 24, 715-725.
Maekawa H., Shozul M., Ishll T., Fryer P., Pearce J. A. (1993) Blueschist metamorphism in an active subduction zone, Japan. Nature 364, 520-523.
Pawley A. R., Redfern S. A. T., Holland T. J. B. (1996) Volume behavior of hydrous minerals at high pressure and temperature: I. Thermal expansion of lawsonite, zoisite, clinozoisite, and diaspore, U.K. American Mineralogist 81, 335-340. 

Calcium minerals
Aluminium minerals
Sorosilicates
Orthorhombic minerals
Minerals in space group 63